Colonia is a compilation album by  Autopsia, released by Staalplaat in Amsterdam, 2002.

Track listing
 Je suis la Resurrection, the main theme from The Pillow Book (film)
 The Fortress Europe
 King og heretics
 Welt ist won Ertz
 Car Dieu a tant aime le monde
 Abfall und Aufsteig
 The secret block for a secret person in Ireland
 Wom Jasagen
 Blue of Noon

References

External links
 Autopsia
 Staalplaat
 Colonia MP3

Autopsia albums
2002 albums